Triniochloa is a genus of Latin American plants in the grass family.

 Species
 Triniochloa andina Luces - Cundinamarca in Colombia, Mérida in Venezuela
 Triniochloa gracilis Gómez-Sánchez & Gonz.-Led. - Guerrero, Oaxaca
 Triniochloa laxa Hitchc. - Chihuahua
 Triniochloa micrantha (Scribn.) Hitchc. - Morelos
 Triniochloa stipoides (Kunth) Hitchc. - Mexico, Central America, Colombia, Venezuela, Ecuador, Peru, Bolivia
 Triniochloa talpensis Gonz.-Led. & Gómez-Sánchez - Jalisco

References

Pooideae
Poaceae genera
Grasses of North America
Grasses of South America
Grasses of Mexico
Taxa named by A. S. Hitchcock